Paulus Pucciarelli, O.P. (1583–1631) was a Roman Catholic prelate who served as Bishop of Andros (1621–1631).

Biography
Paulus Pucciarelli was born in 1583 and ordained a priest in the Order of Preachers.
On 7 June 1621, he was appointed during the papacy of Pope Paul V as Bishop of Andros.
On 13 June 1621, he was consecrated bishop by Giovanni Garzia Mellini, Cardinal-Priest of Santi Quattro Coronati with Paolo De Curtis, Bishop Emeritus of Isernia, and Girolamo Ricciulli, Bishop of Belcastro, serving as co-consecrators. 
He served as Bishop of Andros until his death in 1631.
While bishop, he was the principal co-consecrator of Francesco Sperelli, Coadjutor Bishop of San Severino (1621).

References 

17th-century Roman Catholic bishops in the Republic of Venice
Bishops appointed by Pope Paul V
1583 births
1631 deaths
Dominican bishops